Andrew Hardie Allan (13 June 1869 – 12 May 1916) was an Australian rules footballer who played for the St Kilda Football Club in the Victorian Football League (VFL).

References

External links 

1869 births
1916 deaths
Australian rules footballers from Melbourne
St Kilda Football Club players